Derby Road Ground is a cricket ground in Wirksworth, Derbyshire.  The first recorded match on the ground was in 1866, when Wirksworth played an All-England Eleven.  Derbyshire played a single first-class match on the ground against Kent in 1874.

In local domestic cricket the ground is the home of Wirksworth & Middleton Cricket Club.

References

External links
Derby Road Ground on CricketArchive
Derby Road Ground on Cricinfo

Cricket grounds in Derbyshire
Sports venues completed in 1866
1866 establishments in England